Portrait of P. D. Q. Bach was released in 1977 on Vanguard Records. The album features mostly the work of Peter Schickele writing as P. D. Q. Bach, with one contribution under his own name.

Performers
The New York Pick-Up Ensemble, Professor Peter Schickele, conductor
John Ferrante, bargain counter tenor
Harris Poor, basso blotto
Ransom Wilson and Diva Goodfriend-Koven, tape recorders, hand flutes, corrugahorn, nose flutes
Early Anderson,  interruptus
Duh Brooklyn Boys Chorus, James McCarthy, director
John Solum, flute
Leonard Arner, oboe
Lorin Glickman, bassoon
Theodore Weis, trumpet
William G. Brown, French horn
Neal Di Biase, trombone

Track listing 
Introduction (1:50)
Missa Hilarious, S. N2O
 Yriekay (4:53)
 Gloria (3:02)
 Credo (3:47)
 Sanctus (3:49)
  Dei (3:49)
Introduction (:28)
Eine Kleine Nichtmusik (Schickele) (11:45)
Allegro
Romanze
Menuetto
Rondo (Allegro)
Introduction (1:28)
Echo Sonata for Two Unfriendly Groups of Instruments, S. 99999999 (2:14)
Introduction (1:02)
A Consort of Choral Christmas Carols, S. 359 (6:29)
"Throw the Yule Log On, Uncle John"
"O Little Town of Hackensack"
"Good King Kong Looked Out"

Eine Kleine Nichtmusik
Eine Kleine Nichtmusik ("A Little Not Music"), is a quodlibet consisting of Mozart's work Eine kleine Nachtmusik played in its entirety, along with snippets of dozens of famous tunes heard in counterpoint throughout the piece, taken from both American folk music and the classical repertoire.

Sources
Portrait of P.D.Q. Bach, schickele.com

Notes

External links 
 Complete list of music parodied in Eine Kleine Nichtmusik

P. D. Q. Bach albums
1977 albums
1970s comedy albums
Vanguard Records albums